Morozovka is a rural locality (a selo) in Svyatorussovsky Selsoviet of Romnensky District, Amur Oblast, Russia. The population was 72 as of 2018. There are 2 streets.

Geography 
Morozovka is located 20 km south of Romny (the district's administrative centre) by road. Lyubimoye is the nearest rural locality.

References 

Rural localities in Romnensky District